Arcadia is a village in the towns of Richmond and Exeter in the U.S. state of Rhode Island.

Overview
Secluded from most busy areas, the only way to access the small village located near the tri-point of the towns of Richmond, Exeter and Hopkinton, Rhode Island is by Arcadia Road, via Nooseneck Hill Road, which can be accessed numerous ways, including I-95 exit 4 in Rhode Island. 
The village of Arcadia is located in the Arcadia Management Area. After reaching the village, Arcadia Road turns east towards KG Ranch Road in Richmond, while continuing straight will bring you farther into the village along Summit Road. Summit Road eventually becomes a dirt trail that reaches 10 Rod Road in Exeter.

Arcadia is a small village with a small population; the majority of housing units are located on the Richmond side, at the beginning of Summit Road or on Mill Road.

Arcadia has two postal codes. Those living on the Exeter side use "02822", Exeter, while those on the Richmond side use "02832" Hope Valley.

The Tomaquag Museum is located in Arcadia, on the Exeter side. Within the museum is a private school, the Nuweetooun School.

References

Villages in Washington County, Rhode Island
Villages in Rhode Island